Salvatore Babones (born October 5, 1969) is an American sociologist, and an associate professor at the University of Sydney.

Biography
He received a B.S. in sociology from University of Montevallo in 1991, M.A. in Sociology in 1997, M.S.E in Mathematical Sciences in 2002, and a Ph.D in Sociology in 2003 from Johns Hopkins University. From 2003 to 2008 he has been a professor of sociology at the University of Pittsburgh; since 2008 at the University of Sydney. He has also been a visiting associate professor at Nanyang Technological University in Singapore (2015) and a visiting scholar at Academia Sinica in Taipei (2015).

He has been associated with or written for the Institute for Policy Studies (Washington), the Russian International Affairs Council (Moscow), and the Centre for Independent Studies (Sydney).

Work and views
Babones focuses on the "political sociology of democracy, economic development in post-socialist transition economies and quantitative methods for cross-national comparisons".

United States and Trump 
In 2018, Babones published The New Authoritarianism: Trump, Populism, and the Tyranny of Experts on Donald Trump and his administration. Lacking in sources and notes, he did not intend it to be an academic monograph but rather a political screed. Babones welcomed Trump's populist approach to governance as a dissent against the usual "tyranny of unelected authoritarian experts" in liberal democracies. Rejecting allegations of authoritarianism, he found Trump's administration effective and credited Trump with strengthening democratic ideals by returning power to the electorate. On the overall, populism was a legitimate political position in liberal democracy.

Markus Heide of Uppsala University found Babones' "apolegetic approach" to ignore the anti-democratic rhetoric of Trump and his supporters. Dan Glazebrook, reviewing for The Morning Star, found the work to be an exercise in Trumpian obfuscation. However, the book was favorably received in conservative media: Janet Albrechtsen, reviewing for The Australian, commended Babones for an "overdue [..] corrective about populism"; it went on to feature in the ‘Best [Books] on Politics 2018’ by the Wall Street Journal.

Babones has since held the January 6 United States Capitol attack to be a "mostly peaceful protest"; he argued that Joe Biden was still a bigger threat to democracy on account of being supported by the press.

India 
In September 2022, Babones criticized the democracy indices by Freedom House, V-Dem Institute, and Economist Intelligence Unit for their decision to downgrade India while under Narendra Modi's premiership and called for a retraction; noting their evidence to be flawed and "wildly disproprortionate", he blamed the intellectuals who were surveyed for not being objective in their evaluations. Two months later, in a conclave arranged by India Today, speaking on the same locus, Babones accused the Indian intellectuals of being "anti-India and anti-Modi as a class" in remarks that were widely shared in the social media.

Immigrant students in Australia 
His research into Australian universities' dependence on international (particularly Chinese) students drove political debates in the country.

Books
Babones, S. (2009). The International Structure of Income: Its Implications for Economic Growth. Saarbruecken: VDM Verlag Dr Muller.
Esteva, G., Babones, S., Babcicky, P. (2013). The Future of Development: A Radical Manifesto. Bristol, UK: Policy Press.
Babones, S. (2014). Methods for Quantitative Macro-Comparative Research. Los Angeles: Sage Publications.
Babones, S. (2015). Sixteen for '16: A progressive Agenda for a Better America. Bristol, UK: Policy Press.
Elsenhans, H., and Babones, S. (2017). BRICS or Bust? Escaping the Middle-Income Trap. Stanford: Stanford University Press.
Babones, S. (2017). American Tianxia: Chinese Money, American Power, and the End of History. Bristol, UK: Policy Press.

 Babones, S. (2018). The New Authoritarianism: Trump, Populism, and the Tyranny of Experts. Cambridge, UK: Polity.

 Babones, S. (2021). Australia's Universities: Can They Reform? Brisbane: Ocean Reeve Publishing.

References

External links

American sociologists
1969 births
American expatriate academics
American expatriates in Australia
Academic staff of the University of Sydney
University of Pittsburgh faculty
Johns Hopkins University alumni
Living people
Academics from New Jersey